Moonshine Valley is a thinly populated valley with a population of around 228 in the Wellington Region of New Zealand, centred on the Moonshine Hill Road which leaves State Highway 58 near Judgeford and goes over the Tararua Range to the Riverstone Terraces suburbs and then joins River Road, Upper Hutt. The majority of Moonshine Valley is part of Upper Hutt, although the western part of the valley is part of Porirua.

BRANZ, the Building Research Association of New Zealand headquarters is at the beginning of Moonshine Road near Judgeford.

History  
The valley was settled in the 1860s by settlers including Ephraim Greenwood who had a sawmill and farm.

In World War II there was a camp for the US Marines with a recreation hall and a vehicle servicing depot in the Moonshine Valley.

Demographics

Moonshine Valley had a population of 210 at the 2018 New Zealand census, an increase of 9 people (4.5%) since the 2013 census, and an increase of 6 people (2.9%) since the 2006 census. There were 75 households. There were 105 males and 105 females, giving a sex ratio of 1.0 males per female. The median age was 48.8 years (compared with 37.4 years nationally), with 30 people (14.3%) aged under 15 years, 33 (15.7%) aged 15 to 29, 117 (55.7%) aged 30 to 64, and 27 (12.9%) aged 65 or older.

Ethnicities were 95.7% European/Pākehā, 4.3% Māori, 2.9% Asian, and 4.3% other ethnicities (totals add to more than 100% since people could identify with multiple ethnicities).

Although some people objected to giving their religion, 58.6% had no religion, 30.0% were Christian and 4.3% had other religions.

Of those at least 15 years old, 45 (25.0%) people had a bachelor or higher degree, and 15 (8.3%) people had no formal qualifications. The median income was $55,300, compared with $31,800 nationally. The employment status of those at least 15 was that 111 (61.7%) people were employed full-time, 27 (15.0%) were part-time, and 3 (1.7%) were unemployed.

Notes

References

Valleys of the Wellington Region
Upper Hutt
Populated places in the Wellington Region